Andreas Kunze (1952; Bremen – 8 April 2010; Essen) was a German actor and photographer.

References

External links
Obituary

1952 births
2010 deaths
Actors from Bremen
German male film actors